Roland Rotherham (AKA Roly or Uncle Roly) is a retired British writer and lecturer, who specializes in medieval legends and lore, especially those related to King Arthur, Merlin and Glastonbury. He also is an expert in historical cookery.

A biographical account of Rotherham, in relation to a conference that he attended in 2009, describes him as "Prof. Roland Rotherham B.A.(Hons), M.A, Ph.D., Ed.D, M.I.H.G.S and states that holds degrees in Ancient and Medieval studies, Anglo-Saxon Culture, Heraldry, Anglo-Norman Culture, Ancient and Medieval Cultural Studies, and Education. This account also states that he has travelled "extensively across the globe.Elsewhere, he is stated to have originally served in the cavalry, "serving on the personal staff of HM the Queen", and is cited to hold "BA in Ancient and Medieval Cultural Studies; BA in Theology; MA in Ancient and Medieval Cultural Studies and a Ph.D in Ancient and Medieval Cultural Studies.

In the Netherlands he is especially known for his lectures at fantasy events such as the Elf Fantasy Fair at Castle de Haar and the Midwinter Fair at the Archeon.

He is a member of The Order Of The Fellowship Of The Knights Of The Round Table Of King Arthur. Institute of Heraldic and Genealogical Studies and the Experimental Food Society.

References

External links
Official website of Roland Rotherham
Professor Roland Rotherham at Witchfest UK 2002 (WebCite archive Retrieved: 26 October 2011)
Professor Roland Rotherham on BBC Radio Shropshire
Prof. Dr. Roland Rotherham at the MidWinter Fair 2008 on YouTube

Living people
British writers
Year of birth missing (living people)